Serbia is a sovereign state situated at the crossroads between Central and Southeast Europe, covering the southern part of the Pannonian Plain and the central Balkans. Relative to its small territory,  it is a diverse country distinguished by a transitional character, situated along cultural, geographic, climatic and other boundaries. Serbia is landlocked and borders Hungary to the north; Romania and Bulgaria to the east; North Macedonia and Albania to the south; and Croatia, Bosnia-Herzegovina, and Montenegro to the west.Thanks to its highways (Corridors 10 and 11) and river network (the total length of navigable rivers and channels is 1,395 km), especially Danube river which passes through the country and its capital city Belgrade, Serbia is connected with other important countries such as Turkey, Greece, Austria, Germany, Slovakia, Italy and many more. 
Serbia numbers around 7 million residents.  and its capital, Belgrade. The capital city Belgrade, with its rich history, is one of the oldest cities
in Europe and the largest city in the region with a population of over
1,600,000 people. Besides Belgrade, some of the other important cities are:
Novi Sad, Niš, Kragujevac, Subotica, Šabac, Čačak, Kruševac, Kraljevo,
Užice.

For further information on the types of business entities in this country and their abbreviations, see "Business entities in Serbia".

Notable firms 
This list includes notable companies with primary headquarters located in the country. The industry and sector follow the Industry Classification Benchmark taxonomy. Organizations which have ceased operations are included and noted as defunct.

References

External links

Companies of Serbia
Serbia